Sebastián Álvarez Acre (born 8 July 2002) is a Mexican racing driver that is currently a member of the Escuderia Telmex driver programme and competes in the European Le Mans Series with Inter Europol Competition.

Sebastian has previously raced in the GB3 Championship with Hitech Grand Prix and he is the vice-champion of the 2019 F4 British Championship.

Racing record

Racing career summary

Complete F4 British Championship results
(key) (Races in bold indicate pole position) (Races in italics indicate fastest lap)

Complete GB3 Championship results 
(key) (Races in bold indicate pole position) (Races in italics indicate fastest lap)

Complete WeatherTech SportsCar Championship results 
(key) (Races in bold indicate pole position; races in italics indicate fastest lap)

Complete European Le Mans Series results 
(key) (Races in bold indicate pole position; results in italics indicate fastest lap)

Complete Asian Le Mans Series results 
(key) (Races in bold indicate pole position) (Races in italics indicate fastest lap)

References

External links 
 

Living people
2002 births
Mexican racing drivers
BRDC British Formula 3 Championship drivers
British F4 Championship drivers
European Le Mans Series drivers
Asian Le Mans Series drivers
Double R Racing drivers
Hitech Grand Prix drivers
Karting World Championship drivers
WeatherTech SportsCar Championship drivers